Brión Municipality may refer to:

 Brión, Spain
 Brión Municipality, Miranda

municipality name disambiguation pages